Raquel Naa Ayorkor Ammah (born 12 August 1987) and known by the stage name Raquel, is a Ghanaian musician, composer, choreographer, actress and script writer. She is popularly known for her hit song "Sweetio" which featured Sarkodie.

Early life
Raquel was born in the United Kingdom by Ghanaian parents. She grew up in West London with her mother, two brothers and a sister. Raquel attended many schools because her family moved houses a few times. However, her favourite schools remained Hogarth Primary School based in Chiswick, and West Thames College.

Career
Raquel officially entered the music scene in 2005 and has since shared the same stage with international acts like Mario, Movado, Young (U.S) Lloyd (U.S), Kas (Nigeria), Cabbo Snoop (Angola), Duncan Mighty (Nigeria), Stephanie Benson (UK/Ghana). She released "Odo" as her official hit single in July 2010.

Philanthropy
As part of her social responsibility, Raquel has voluntarily been a mentor for a private charity within her local community in Ghana called Christ Humanitarian Foundation (CHF). She acts as a public advocate for the foundation to help them raise funds each year.

Awards and nominations
She won the Best Female Artist 2012, at the YFM All Star Weekend Awards, December, 2012. She also had one nomination at the Hip Hop and RnB Awards 2011.

References

Living people
1987 births
Ga-Adangbe people
Ghanaian women musicians